General elections were held in Jamaica on 10 April 1962. The result was a victory for the Jamaica Labour Party, which won 26 of the 45 seats. Voter turnout was 72.9%.

Results

References

1962 in Jamaica
Elections in Jamaica
Jamaica